Lepidophyma reticulatum,  the Costa Rican tropical night lizard, is a species of lizard in the family Xantusiidae. It is a small lizard found in Costa Rica and Panama.

References

Lepidophyma
Reptiles of Costa Rica
Reptiles of Panama
Reptiles described in 1955
Taxa named by Edward Harrison Taylor